Tony James Wilkinson, FBA (14 August 1948 – 25 December 2014) was a British archaeologist and academic, specialising in landscape archaeology and the Ancient Near East. He was Professor of Archaeology at the University of Edinburgh from 2005 to 2006, and Professor of Archaeology at Durham University from 2006 to until his death in 2014.

Early life
Wilkinson was born on 14 August 1948 and was brought up in Essex, England. From 1966 to 1969, he studied geography at Birkbeck, University of London, graduating with a Bachelor of Science (BSC) degree. He then undertook post-graduate study at McMaster University, Ontario, Canada, graduating from there with a Master of Science (MSc) degree in 1972. He never undertook a doctorate.

Academic career
Wilkinson worked as a consultant landscape archaeologist from 1972 to 1989. Between 1989 and 1992, he was the Assistant Director of the British School of Archaeology in Iraq. From 1995 to 2003, he worked at the University of Chicago, first as a research associate and then as an associate professor. During the 1990s, he founded the 'Center for Ancient Middle Eastern Landscapes' of the Oriental Institute, University of Chicago.

In 2003, he returned to the United Kingdom to become a lecturer at the University of Edinburgh. He was promoted to Professor of Near Eastern Archaeology in 2005. In 2006, he left Edinburgh to become Professor of Archaeology at Durham University. In addition to his research and teaching within the Department of Archaeology, he was involved with Durham's Institute of Advanced Study.

Wilkinson had undertaken archaeological surveys in northern Syria, Iran and northern Iraq. He worked with declassified CORONA satellite images to research ancient sites and landscapes of Upper Mesopotamia. He was director of the Land of Carchemish project investigating the surrounding landscape of Carchemish, a Bronze Age capital city.

Personal life
In 1995, Wilkinson married Eleanor Rose Barbanes. She is also an archaeologist, and collaborated with her husband on a number of projects and publications.

He died on 25 December 2014 from cancer.

Honours
Wilkinson received two awards for his monograph titled Archaeological Landscapes of the Near East: the Society for American Archaeology Book Award in 2004 and the James R. Wiseman Book Award by the Archaeological Institute of America in 2005. In 2008, he was elected Fellow of the British Academy (FBA), the UK's national academy for the humanities and the social sciences. In 2009, he was awarded the John Coles Medal for Landscape Archaeology by the British Academy. The medal is awarded biennially 'for distinguished achievements in landscape archaeology'.

A memorial volume, New Agendas in Remote Sensing and Landscape Archaeology in the Near East: Studies in Honour of Tony J. Wilkinson was published in 2020, edited and containing chapters by many of Wilkinson's former students.

Works

References

1948 births
2014 deaths
British archaeologists
Academics of the University of Edinburgh
Academics of Durham University
Fellows of the British Academy
University of Chicago faculty
Alumni of Birkbeck, University of London
McMaster University alumni
Archaeologists of the Near East
20th-century archaeologists
21st-century archaeologists
Landscape historians